Bicycle Lake Army Airfield  is a military airport located on the Bicycle dry lake bed, three miles (5 km) northeast of the Fort Irwin cantonment area, in the Mojave Desert of San Bernardino County, California, United States. It is owned and operated by the United States Army.

References

External links 
 

 

Airports in San Bernardino County, California
United States Army airfields
Military facilities in the Mojave Desert